Ride the Lightning is the second studio album by American heavy metal band Metallica.

Ride the Lightning may also refer to:
Ride the Lightning (Marshmallow Coast album), 2001 album
"Ride the Lightning" (John Kings song), 1975 song
"Ride the Lightning" (Metallica song), song from the Metallica album of the same name

See also
"Riding the Lightning", 14th episode from season 1 of Criminal Minds